The five water management districts in Florida are:

Southwest Florida Water Management District nicknamed "Swiftmud" or SWFWMD 
South Florida Water Management District nicknamed "Softmud" or SFWMD 
Northwest Florida Water Management District (NWFWMD) stretching from the St. Marks River Basin in Jefferson County to the Perdido River n Escambia County
St. Johns River Water Management District (SJRWMD) 
Suwannee River Water Management District (SRWMD)

District commissioners are nominated by the governor of the state, and approved by the state senate. They receive no pay.

References

Water in Florida
State agencies of Florida